Teodora Ivanova Zareva (born 10 December 1963) is a Bulgarian rower. She competed at the 1988 Summer Olympics and the 1992 Summer Olympics.

References

1963 births
Living people
Bulgarian female rowers
Olympic rowers of Bulgaria
Rowers at the 1988 Summer Olympics
Rowers at the 1992 Summer Olympics
Rowers from Sofia